The abhenry is the CGS (centimetre–gram–second) electromagnetic unit of inductance, corresponding to one billionth of a henry (1 nH).

References

Centimetre–gram–second system of units
Units of electrical inductance